Hemiphyllodactylus yunnanensis, also known as the Asian slender gecko, Yunnan gypsy gecko, or Yunnan dwarf gecko, is a species of gecko. It is found in southern and southwestern China (Guizhou, Yunnan, Tibet), northern Myanmar, Laos, Vietnam, Cambodia, and Thailand.

References

Hemiphyllodactylus
Reptiles of Cambodia
Reptiles of China
Reptiles of Laos
Reptiles of Myanmar
Reptiles of Thailand
Reptiles of Vietnam
Fauna of Tibet
Reptiles described in 1903
Taxa named by George Albert Boulenger